Berezovka is a rural locality (a selo) in Berezovsky Selsoviet, Birsky District, Bashkortostan, Russia. The population was 534 as of 2010. There are 13 streets.

Geography 
Aybashevo is the nearest rural locality.

References 

Rural localities in Birsky District